Traveller's Prayer is an album by John Renbourn, released in 1998. It was recorded in Dublin.

Critical reception
The Birmingham Evening Mail deemed the album "pleasant if you're just curious, paradise if you're a folkie or guitar buff."

Track listing
 "Bunyan's Hymn (Monks Gate)" – 3:11
 "When the Wind Blows" – 6:17
 "Wexford Lullaby" – 4:37
 "I Saw Three Ships/Newgate Hornpipe" – 7:39
 "Planxty Llanthony/Loftus Jones" – 5:36
 "Fagottanz" – 4:02
 "At the Break of Day" – 3:49
 "Traveller's Prayer" – 2:45
 "South Wind/Feathered Nest" – 9:14
 "Estampie" – 5:15

Tracks 3 & 8, unusually, do not include Renbourn, but are a cappella songs by Maighread Ní Dhomhnaill and The Voice Squad

References

1998 albums
John Renbourn albums